"Jaggies" is the informal name for artifacts in raster images, most frequently from aliasing, which in turn is often caused by non-linear mixing effects producing high-frequency components, or missing or poor anti-aliasing filtering prior to sampling.

Jaggies are stair-like lines that appear where there should be "smooth" straight lines or curves. For example, when a nominally straight, un-aliased line steps across one pixel either horizontally or vertically, a "dogleg" occurs halfway through the line, where it crosses the threshold from one pixel to the other.

Jaggies should not be confused with most compression artifacts, which are a different phenomenon.

Causes 
Jaggies occur due to the "staircase effect". This is because a line represented in raster mode is approximated by a sequence of pixels. Jaggies can occur for a variety of reasons, the most common being that the output device (display monitor or printer) does not have enough resolution to portray a smooth line. In addition, jaggies often occur when a bit-mapped image is converted to a different resolution. This is one of the advantages that vector graphics have over bitmapped graphics – the output looks the same regardless of the resolution of the output device.

Solutions 
The effect of jaggies can be reduced somewhat by a graphics technique known as spatial anti-aliasing. Anti-aliasing smooths out jagged lines by surrounding the jaggies with transparent pixels to simulate the appearance of fractionally-filled pixels. The downside of anti-aliasing is that it reduces contrast – rather than sharp black/white transitions, there are shades of gray – and the resulting image is fuzzy. This is an inescapable trade-off: if the resolution is insufficient to display the desired detail, the output will either be jagged or fuzzy, or some combination thereof.

In addition, jaggies often occur when a bit mapped image is converted to a different resolution. They can occur for variety of reasons, the most common being that the output device (display monitor or printer) does not have enough resolution to portray a smooth line.

In real-time computer graphics, especially gaming, anti-aliasing is used to remove jaggies created by the edges of polygons and other lines entirely. Some video game developers do not enable anti-aliasing by default for their games because the intended hardware is not powerful enough to run it at smooth frames per second if anti-aliasing is enabled. On eighth-generation video game consoles, such as the PlayStation 4 and Xbox One, anti-aliasing and frame rate has been heavily improved. Jaggies in bitmaps, such as sprites and surface materials, are most often dealt with by separate texture filtering routines, which are far easier to perform than anti-aliasing filtering. Texture filtering became ubiquitous on PCs after the introduction of 3Dfx's Voodoo GPU.

Notable uses of the term 
In the Atari 8-bit game Rescue on Fractalus!, developed by Lucasfilm Games and published in 1985, the graphics depicting the cockpit of the player's spacecraft contains two window struts, which are not anti-aliased and are therefore very "jagged". The developers made fun of this and named the in-game enemies "Jaggi", and also initially titled the game Behind Jaggi Lines!. The latter idea was scrapped by the marketing department before release.

See also 
 Posterization

References

Computer graphic artifacts
Image processing